Robert Aylward may refer to:

Bob Aylward (1911–1974), Irish Fianna Fáil politician, senator from 1973–1974
His son Bobby Aylward (born 1955), Irish Fianna Fáil politician, TD 2007–2011
Robert Aylward (Canadian politician) (born 1946), politician in Newfoundland, Canada
Robert Aylward (sport shooter), see 300 metre rifle three positions